Anton Valeryevich Antipov (born 20 April 1990) is a Russian professional football player.

Career
Antipov made his professional debut for PFC Spartak Nalchik on 17 July 2011 in the Russian Cup game against FC Torpedo Vladimir. He made his Russian Football National League debut for Spartak Nalchik on 11 July 2016 in a game against FC Kuban Krasnodar.

External links
 
 

1990 births
Sportspeople from Nalchik
Living people
Russian footballers
Association football goalkeepers
PFC Spartak Nalchik players
FC Avangard Kursk players
FC Chayka Peschanokopskoye players
FC Mashuk-KMV Pyatigorsk players